Virgate (from the Latin , "rod-like") is an adjective in botanical and mycological jargon.

Botany
In botanical jargon, virgate most often refers to plants with wand-shaped erect branches or stems. For smaller plants or structures, the diminutive virgulate is used. The term occurs commonly in the biological names of plants, such as Vaccinium virgatum or Chloris virgata.

Mycology
In mycological jargon, virgate and virgulate are used to describe mushroom caps (pilei) with pronounced radiating stripes or ribs, as in Tricholoma virgatum.

References

Plant morphology